Boxing is one of the sports contested at the 2022 Commonwealth Games, to be held in Birmingham, England at the National Exhibition Centre Hall 4. It is one of the founding sports, having featured in every edition of the Games since the inaugural 1930 edition; the boxing competition will take place within England for the third time.

The competition is scheduled to take place between 29 July and 7 August 2022, spread across sixteen events.

Schedule
The competition schedule is as follows:

Venue
The boxing competition will be held at the National Exhibition Centre in Solihull. Five other sports - badminton, netball, para powerlifting, table tennis, and weightlifting - will also take place there.

Medal summary

Medal table

Medallists

Men

Women

Participating nations
There were 55 participating Commonwealth Games Associations (CGAs) in boxing with a total of 231 athletes (172 men and 59 women). The number of athletes a nation entered is in parentheses beside the name of the country.

References

External links
Official website: 2022 Commonwealth Games – Boxing

 
2022
2022 Commonwealth Games events
Boxing competitions in the United Kingdom
2022 in boxing